Juan Hormaechea Cazón (5 June 1939 – 1 December 2020) was a Spanish politician who served as President of Cantabria between 1987 and 1990, and again from 1991 to 1995. He was also Mayor of Santander between 1977 and 1987. Hormaechea founded the Union for the Progress of Cantabria (UPCA) political party in 1991 after a split from the larger People's Party of Cantabria (PP). The UPCA dissolved in 2003.

On 24 October 1994 the High Court of Justice of Cantabria condemned him to 6 years and one day in prison and 14 years of disqualification for a crime of embezzlement and another of prevarication.
He never entered jail because he was pardoned by Prime Minister Felipe González in 1995.

References

1939 births
2020 deaths
Presidents of Cantabria
Members of the Parliament of Cantabria
Mayors of places in Cantabria
Politicians from Cantabria
Leaders of political parties in Spain
Union for the Progress of Cantabria politicians
People from Santander, Spain
Spanish politicians convicted of crimes